Notoxus montanus is a species of monoceros beetle in the family Anthicidae. It is found in North America.

References

Further reading

 
 
 

Anthicidae